In computing, resident set size (RSS) is the portion of memory occupied by a process that is held in main memory (RAM).  The rest of the occupied memory exists in the swap space or file system, either because some parts of the occupied memory were paged out, or because some parts of the executable were never loaded.

See also 

 Proportional set size (PSS)
 Unique set size (USS)
 Demand paging
 Virtual memory
 Working set
 Working set size

References

External links 
 Simple resident set size limits, LWN.net, August 10, 2004, by Jonathan Corbet
 ELC: How much memory are applications really using?, LWN.net, April 18, 2007, by Jonathan Corbet

Memory management